Vice Admiral Eduardo Serra is an Italian naval officer.

He attended the Francesco Morosini Naval Military School in Venice from 1973 to 1976 before attending the Italian Naval Academy from 1976 to 1980.

He was appointed Commander Maritime Command South on 6 November 2015 with a promotion to vice admiral in 2017, a position he held until October 2017. On 27 October 2017 he was appointed Commander of Logistics Command.

Education
He obtained a degree in Maritime and Naval Science from the University of Pisa

References

Italian admirals
Living people
1958 births